Shorefall is a 2020 fantasy novel by Robert Jackson Bennett. It was first published by Del Rey on April 21, 2020.

Synopsis 
Several years after expert thief Sancia Grado and her allies Orso, Gregor, and Berenice created Foundryside—a merchant house specializing in the mass production of sigils—the team continue their war against the other houses to create a fair society out of Tevanne. When the god-like hierophant Crasedes Magnus is reborn, the crew find themselves in a race against time to prevent wholesale slaughter and the end of their world.

By the novel's end, Tevanne has become embroiled in a war as the consciousness of Tevanne melded with Gregor fights Crasedes to seize control of the city. Orso sacrifices himself to allow Sancia and Berenice to escape across the sea where they hope to find help.

Reception 
Writing for Tor.com, Martin Cahill heaped praise for the "heart and intricate characters who love and care for each other", lauding it as a "stunning novel that shows exactly what [fantasy] can do." Kirkus Reviews labeled the novel an "expertly spun yarn", comparing it to "Tolkien meets A.I." and commending the blend between technology, philosophy, and fantasy. Shorefall was also a staff pick by Locus in December 2020.

Amal El-Mohtar praised the series in general, commenting on the "fantastic explorations of capital, empire, and collective action in intricately imagined words" with particular note that the "most recent instalment surpasses [the] preceding work, which is a tough thing to do."

References 

2020 American novels
American fantasy novels
Del Rey books